Eritrea–Turkey relations are the foreign relations between Eritrea and Turkey. Turkey has an embassy in Asmara since 2013, while Eritrea does not have an embassy in Turkey but the Turkish embassy in Doha, Qatar, is accredited for Eritrea. Turkey was one of the first countries to recognize Eritrea in 1993 and both countries established diplomatic relations in the same year.

Osman Saleh Mohammed, Minister of Foreign Affairs of Eritrea visited Turkey once in December 2011 and then the Turkish Minister of Foreign Affairs, Ahmet Davutoğlu visited Eritrea once in November 2012. In 2016, Turkey exported $15.600.000 worth of goods and imported $2.300.000 worth of goods.

Since August 2014, Turkish Airlines (THY) operates 3 flights between Istanbul and Asmara each week.

See also 
 Foreign relations of Eritrea
 Foreign relations of Turkey

References 

 
Eritrea
Turkey